Lazarus Rising may refer to:
 Lazarus Rising (novel), a science fiction novel by David Sherman and Dan Cragg
 Lazarus Rising: A Personal and Political Autobiography, an autobiography of John Howard
 "Lazarus Rising" (Supernatural), an episode of Supernatural

See also
 The Raising of Lazarus (disambiguation)